Davorlim is a town and suburb of city of Margao in South Goa district  in the state of Goa, India.

Geography
It has an average elevation of 31 metres (102 feet).

Demographics
As of 2001 census of India, Davorlim had a population of 10,923. Males constitute 52% of the population and females 48%. Davorlim has an average literacy rate of 73%, higher than the national average of 59.5%: male literacy is 78% and, female literacy is 68%. In Davorlim, 12% of the population is under 6 years of age.

References

External links 

Cities and towns in South Goa district
Comunidades of Goa